Astagaon is a village in parner taluka in Ahmednagar district of state of Maharashtra, India.

Population
As per 2011 census, population of Astagaon is 7733. 4046 are male whereas 3687 are female.

Religion
The majority of the population in the village is Hindu.

Economy
The majority of the population has farming as their primary occupation.

See also
 List of villages in parner taluka

References 

Villages in Ahmednagar district